Ari Renaldi is an Indonesian music producer, composer, arranger, sound and mixing engineer, music director and musician. His production credits include Mocca, Tulus, Vidi Aldiano, Raisa Andriana, Afgan, Yura Yunita, Sezairi Sezali, Maudy Ayunda, Rossa, Ungu, Juicy Luicy, Yovie & Nuno amongst many others.

During college years, Renaldi started his career as session drummer for Project Pop, Glenn Fredly, Rio Febrian, R42 and many others. He is currently the drummer for 4Peniti, a jazz band based in Bandung and was formed in 2002 with Rudy Zulkarnaen (simakDialog), Ammy Kurniawan and Zaki 'Peniti'. Renaldi is a member of 2010 and 2012 Mix With The Masters series.

Beside record producing, Renaldi have done music directing for concerts and live performances as well. He is the music director for all of Tulus major performances, including 2015 and 2017 Java Jazz International Festival, 2016 San Francisco US Live and other eight solo concerts (Tulus: An Introduction, Beyond Sincere, Diorama, Gajah Concert Tour, Konser Monokrom Malaysia, Bandung, Jakarta) from 2011 to 2015 in Bandung, Jakarta and Yogyakarta cities in Indonesia. He is also the music director for Tulus at the collaboration concert between Ari Lasso and Tulus titled "Dua Ruang" held at Istora Senayan, Jakarta on October 4, 2015.

Achievements 
On 2015 at the 18th Anugerah Musik Indonesia (AMI) Awards, an annual Indonesian major music awards, he won four AMI awards for Best of the Best Album, Best of the Best Production Work, Best Pop Album and Best Mix Engineer out of seven nominations, mostly for his works with Tulus in Gajah album in which he acts as the album producer. In 2008, he also won an AMI Award for Best Alternative Production Works with Mocca in Colours album.

In 2017, he won all AMI awards for the top categories including Best of the Best Album, Best of the Best Production Work, Best Pop Album, Best Sound Production Team and Best Soul/R&B/Urban Album. At the latest 2019 AMI Award, he again received AMI Award for Best Pop Album Producer for his work with Yura Yunita in Merakit Album and Best Sound Production Team for Adu Rayu (Yovie Widianto, Tulus, Glenn Fredly), one of the most highly appreciated single of the year in Indonesia. Until 2019, Renaldi has won 13 awards and been nominated 25 times by AMI Awards.

His works often receive positive reviews and recognition, especially "Gajah" and "Yura" albums which was ranked the 1st and 6th in the 20 Best Album of 2014 by Rolling Stone Indonesia magazine in addition to their nominations as Best Pop Album and Best Soul/R&B Album in the 2015 AMI Awards. "Gajah" album was also listed among the top 9 Indonesian albums by Tempo magazine.

In addition, four of his produced singles, namely Jatuh Hati (Raisa), Cinta dan Rahasia (Yura Yunita), 1000 Tahun Lamanya (Tulus) dan Teman Hidup (Tulus) were published as Top 10 Indonesian Songs 2015 by one of the biggest social media company, Path Indonesia.

Anugerah Musik Indonesia Award 
Renaldi's Anugerah Musik Indonesia (Indonesian Music Awards) wins and nominations are:

Bandung Music Award

Anugerah Industri Muzik (AIM) Award

Anugerah Planet Muzik (APM) Award

Production Discography

Single/Song 
Ari Renaldi has been credited as producer and arranger and/or mixing engineer on the following songs:

Album 
Ari Renaldi has been credited as producer, arranger and/or mixing engineer on the following albums:

Mixing credits 
Ari Renaldi has been credited as mix engineer in the following albums and songs:

 2016: The Groove - Forever U'll Be Mine (album)
 2015: Maudy Ayunda - Moments (album)
 2015: Ungu - Mozaik (album)
 2013: Vidi Aldiano - Dunia Baru
 2013: The Soul Of Magnolia - Bintang (album)
 2011: Liyana Fizi - Between The Lines (album)
 2006: Rieka Roslan - Bercerita (album)

Concert Production Credit 

 2019: TULUS Festival Sewindu Jakarta, as music director and Drums
2019: TULUS Sewindu Tour Indonesia (Malang, Solo, Yogyakarta), as music director and Drummer
2019: TULUS Sewindu Tour Kuala Lumpur, as music director and Drums
2019: YURA Merakit Konser Jakarta, as music director and Mixing Engineer
 2019: YURA Merakit Intimate Concert Bandung, as music director and Mixing Engineer 
 2019: TULUS Konser Monokrom Jakarta, as music director and Drums
 2018: TULUS Konser Monokrom Bandung, as music director and Drums
 2018: TULUS Live at Istana Budaya Kuala Lumpur, as music director and Drums
 2016: TULUS San Francisco US Live, as music director and Drums
 2015: Konser Gajah TULUS Yogyakarta, as music director and Mixing Engineer
 2014: Konser Gajah TULUS Jakarta, as music director and Mixing Engineer
 2014: Konser Gajah TULUS Bandung, as music director and Mixing Engineer
 2013: Konser Diorama TULUS, Bandung, as music director and Mixing Engineer
 2012: TULUS: Beyond Sincere Concert Bandung, as music director and Mixing Engineer
 2011: TULUS: An Introduction, Bandung as music director and Mixing Engineer

References

External links 
 Tulus Diskografi
 Tulus – Beyond Sincere : The Report
 Ari Renaldi
 Twitter
 Sezairi: ‘This is kind of a selfish album’
 The Jakarta Post - The Musical World Of Tulus

Living people
Indonesian record producers
People from Bandung
Indonesian composers
Indonesian musicians
Indonesian producers
Year of birth missing (living people)